Elkhart County Courthouse is a historic courthouse located at Goshen, Elkhart County, Indiana, USA. It was originally built in 1868–1870, and renovated between 1905 and 1908 in the Renaissance Revival style. It is a three-story, brick building with a clay tile dome tower. It features a portico with four freestanding Doric order columns, with stylized triglyphs, set on a rusticated podium.

It was added to the National Register of Historic Places in 1980.

References

County courthouses in Indiana
Courthouses on the National Register of Historic Places in Indiana
Renaissance Revival architecture in Indiana
Government buildings completed in 1868
Buildings and structures in Elkhart County, Indiana
National Register of Historic Places in Elkhart County, Indiana
1868 establishments in Indiana